Something Special is a live album by American jazz pianist Hampton Hawes recorded in 1976 and released on the Contemporary label in 1994.

Reception 
The Allmusic review by Scott Yanow states "This excellent music gives no hints of Hawes' upcoming demise".

Track listing 
All compositions by Hampton Hawes except as indicated
 "BD & DS Blues"  - 7:37
 "Pablito" - 8:58
 "Sunny"  (Bobby Hebb) - 9:19
 "Nice Meanderings" - 8:52
 "St. Thomas" (Sonny Rollins) - 5:00
 "Fly Me to the Moon" (Bart Howard) - 9:13

Personnel
Hampton Hawes - piano
Denny Diaz - guitar
Leroy Vinnegar - bass
Al Williams - drums

References

Contemporary Records live albums
Hampton Hawes live albums
1994 live albums